Paper Monsters is the debut solo studio album by English singer Dave Gahan. It was released on 2 June 2003 in the United Kingdom by Mute Records and the following day in North America by Reprise Records.

Background and release
The album was produced by Ken Thomas, known for his work with Icelandic band Sigur Rós. Upon its debut, critical reception was generally mixed; while many complimented the album's personal subject matter, others described it as lacking depth. Paper Monsters debuted at number 36 on the UK Albums Chart, while reaching the top 10 in Germany, Sweden and Switzerland. In North America, the album was released on 3 June 2003. In March 2004, Gahan released the live video album Live Monsters, containing footage from his concert on 5 July 2003 at the Olympia in Paris.

Gahan first played with the idea of releasing a solo album after the release of Depeche Mode's Exciter in 2001, but approached the project slowly. It was not until he began writing music with friend and musician Knox Chandler that he gained the self-confidence he needed to begin to consider working on an album of his own material.

Singles
The album spawned three singles. "Dirty Sticky Floors", the lead single from the album, became Gahan's most successful solo release, reaching number 18 on the UK Singles Chart and the top 10 in Germany and Italy. Its remixes were also promoted in US dance clubs, and peaked within the top five of the Billboard Hot Dance Music/Club Play chart.

The second single, "I Need You", was a ballad based around a synth and drum arrangement, which reached number 27 in the UK and number five on the US dance chart.

The third and final single was "Bottle Living" / "Hold On", a double A-side. meaning that two songs were released on the same single. The single continued the album's string of top-40 singles, reaching number 36 in the UK.

Critical reception

Paper Monsters received generally positive reviews from music critics. At Metacritic, which assigns a normalised rating out of 100 to reviews from mainstream publications, the album received an average score of 79, based on nine reviews.

In a review for BBC Music, Kate Lawrence called Paper Monsters "an assured debut" with "surprising depth". She was impressed by Gahan's vocals on the track "Hidden Houses", which she called "deliciously devilish and angelic in equal measure" and said that it "demonstrates a vocal range rarely seen in the Mode back catalogue". Slant Magazine echoed Lawrence's review for BBC Music, calling the album a "competent solo debut" with "murky rock grooves and throaty vocals".

However, Pitchfork reviewer Michael Idov was less impressed with the album and wrote that its personal subject matter made for a "faintly embarrassing listen". Idov criticised Gahan's lyrics stating that his "vocal can still elevate the dumbest lyric to the level of a cathartic mantra, a skill that comes handy in the absence of Martin Gore". AllMusic reviewer Don Kline called Paper Monsters "a mix of swampy blues-injected rock, slick urban electronica, and atmospheric balladry" and gave it three out of five stars. He also stated that "although it doesn't stray too far from the Depeche mould, Gahan does manage to put his own stamp on the songs".

Track listing
All tracks are written by Dave Gahan and Knox Chandler.

 "Dirty Sticky Floors" – 3:32
 "Hold On" – 4:17
 "A Little Piece" – 5:10
 "Bottle Living" – 3:31
 "Black and Blue Again" – 5:41
 "Stay" – 4:17
 "I Need You" – 4:45
 "Bitter Apple" – 5:59
 "Hidden Houses" – 5:01
 "Goodbye" – 5:54

Limited edition bonus DVD
 A Short Film
 "Dirty Sticky Floors" music video
 Exclusive B-roll footage from the "Dirty Sticky Floors" video shoot
 "Hold On" (exclusive New York acoustic performance)
 "A Little Piece" (exclusive New York acoustic performance)
 Exclusive B-roll footage from the New York acoustic performance
 Photo gallery

Personnel
Credits adapted from the liner notes of Paper Monsters.

Musicians
 Dave Gahan – vocals, keyboards, Fender Rhodes, harmonica, glockenspiel
 Knox Chandler – guitars, dulcimer, cellos, basses, keyboards, sampler, vibraphone, programming, all string arrangements
 Victor Indrizzo – drums 
 Paul Garisto – drums 
 Doug Petty – piano 
 Dee Lewis – backing vocals 
 Jane Scarpantoni – cello
 Antoine Silverman, Maxim Moston, Joan Wasser – violins 
 David Gold – viola 
 Jolyon Thomas – tambourine, tom 
 John Collyer – programming

Technical
 Ken Thomas – production, mixing
 Jonathan Adler – recording engineering
 Jack Clark – mix engineering
 Mike Marsh – mastering

Artwork
 Anton Corbijn – photography, art direction
 Four5One Creative – design

Charts

Weekly charts

Year-end charts

Certifications and sales

Release history

References

External links
 Album information from the official Dave Gahan website

2003 debut albums
Albums produced by Ken Thomas (record producer)
Albums recorded at Electric Lady Studios
Dave Gahan albums
Mute Records albums
Reprise Records albums